Susan Holbrook is a Canadian poet, whose collection Throaty Wipes was shortlisted for the Governor General's Award for English-language poetry at the 2016 Governor General's Awards.

Her debut poetry collection, misled, was published in 1999 while she was a graduate student at the University of Calgary. It was shortlisted for the Pat Lowther Award and the Alberta Writers Guild's Stephan G. Stephansson Award for Poetry. She then began teaching literature and creative writing at the University of Windsor, and followed up with Good Egg Bad Seed in 2004 and Joy Is So Exhausting in 2009. The latter collection was a shortlisted Trillium Award finalist in 2010.

She has also published the poetry textbook How to Read (and Write About) Poetry (2015), and wrote the play Why Do I Feel Guilty in the Changeroom at Britannia Pool? (2002).

Her 2021 collection Ink Earl was shortlisted for the 2022 ReLit Award for poetry.

Works
misled (1999)
Why Do I Feel Guilty in the Changeroom at Britannia Pool? (2002)
Good Egg Bad Seed (2004)
Joy Is So Exhausting (2009)
How to Read (and Write About) Poetry (2015)
Throaty Wipes (2016)
Ink Earl (2021)

References

21st-century Canadian dramatists and playwrights
21st-century Canadian poets
Canadian women dramatists and playwrights
Canadian women poets
Canadian LGBT poets
Canadian LGBT dramatists and playwrights
Canadian lesbian writers
Academic staff of University of Windsor
University of Calgary alumni
Living people
21st-century Canadian women writers
1967 births
Lesbian dramatists and playwrights
21st-century Canadian LGBT people